Josiane Patricia Soloniaina (born 25 April 1978 in Itasy) is a female wrestler who represented Madagascar at the 2012 Summer Olympics. She is one of three sports-people on the team to qualify for the Olympics rather than win a wild-card spot.

References

External links
 

1978 births
Living people
Malagasy female sport wrestlers
Olympic wrestlers of Madagascar
Wrestlers at the 2012 Summer Olympics
People from Itasy Region